Takamaka is the name of several places in the Indian Ocean:
Takamaka, Réunion,  a village in Réunion
Takamaka, Seychelles is a region of Mahé, Seychelles
Île Takamaka (disambiguation), the name of two islands in the Chagos Archipelago
Calophyllum tacamahaca, a genus of tropical flowering plants